Cornwallis is an unincorporated community in Ritchie County, West Virginia, United States. This community was named in honor of Lord Cornwallis.

References 

Unincorporated communities in West Virginia
Unincorporated communities in Ritchie County, West Virginia